James Stuart (1868–1942) was a civil servant of the Colony of Natal and Zulu linguist; also a collector of Zulu oral tradition. He compiled five school readers containing Zulu poetry and narrative.

Works

Bibliography 
 
 
 
 

1868 births
1942 deaths
Linguists from the United Kingdom
20th-century linguists
Linguists of Zulu